Zygmunt, Zigmunt, Zigmund and spelling variations thereof are masculine given names and occasionally surnames. People so named include:

Given name

Medieval period
 Sigismund I the Old (1467–1548), Zygmunt I Stary in Polish, King of Poland and Grand Duke of Lithuania
 Sigismund II Augustus (1520–1572), Zygmunt II August in Polish, King of Poland and Grand Duke of Lithuania, only son of Sigismund I
 Sigismund III Vasa (1566–1632), Zygmunt III Waza in Polish, King of Poland, Grand Duke of Lithuania, monarch of the united Polish–Lithuanian Commonwealth and King of Sweden
 Zygmunt Grudziński (1560–1618), Polish nobleman, voivode (ruler) of Rawa
 Zygmunt Grudziński (1568–1653), Polish nobleman, voivode of Innowrocław and Kalisz
 Zygmunt Przyjemski of Rawicz (died 1652), Polish military commander 
 Zygmunt Kazanowski (1563–1634), Polish nobleman, soldier and magnate in the Polish-Lithuanian Commonwealth
 Zygmunt Tarło (c. 1561 or 1562–1628), Polish–Lithuanian nobleman
 Zygmunt Unrug (1676–1732), Polish szlachta nobleman

Modern era

A–H
Zygmunt Adamczyk (1923–1985), Polish footballer
Zygmunt Ajdukiewicz (1861–1917), Polish realist painter
Zygmunt Anczok (born 1946), Polish footballer
Zygmunt Andrychiewicz (1861–1943), Polish painter of portraits, landscapes, and genre scenes
Zygmunt Balicki (1858–1916), Polish sociologist
Zygmunt Bauman (1925–2017), Polish sociologist
Zygmunt Berling (1896–1980), Polish general
Zygmunt Białostocki (1897–1942), Polish Jewish musician and composer
Zygmunt Witymir Bieńkowski (1913–1979), Polish pilot and a writer of articles and poems
Zygmunt Biesiadecki (1894–1944), Polish actor and director
Zygmunt Wilhelm Birnbaum (1903–2000), Polish-American mathematician and statistician
Zygmunt Bogdziewicz (1941–2016), Polish sports shooter
Zygmunt Bohusz-Szyszko (1893–1982), Polish general
Zygmunt Buhl (1927–1978), Polish sprinter
Zygmunt Chmielewski (1894–1978), Polish film actor
Zygmunt Choreń (born 1941), Polish naval architect
Zygmunt Chruściński (1899–1952), Polish footballer
Zygmunt Chychła (1926-2009), Polish boxer and 1952 Olympic welterweight champion
Zygmunt Czerny (1888–1975), Polish romance philologist
Zygmunt Czyżewski (1910–1998), Polish ice hockey and football player and football manager
Zygmunt Szczęsny Feliński (1822–1895), professor of the Saint Petersburg Roman Catholic Theological Academy and Archbishop of Warsaw
Zygmunt Frankiewicz (born 1955), Polish politician
Zygmunt Gadecki (1938–2000), Polish footballer and Olympian
Zygmunt Garłowski (1949–2008), Polish footballer
Zygmunt Ginter (1916–1964), Polish ice hockey player
Zygmunt Gloger (1845–1910), Polish historian, archaeologist, geographer and ethnographer
Zygmunt Gorazdowski (1845–1920), Polish Roman Catholic priest
Ziggy Gordon, Scottish footballer
Zygmunt Grabowski (1891–1939), Polish painter
Zygmunt Gross (born 1936), Polish professional footballer
Zygmunt Grudziński (1870–1929), Polish radiologist
Zygmunt Andrzej Heinrich (1937–1989), Polish mountaineer
Zygmunt Heljasz (1908–1963), Polish shot putter and discus thrower
Zygmunt Hübner (1930–1989), Polish film actor

J–M 
Zygmunt Jałoszyński (born 1946), Polish javelin thrower
Zygmunt Janiszewski (1888–1920), Polish mathematician
Zygmunt Kaczkowski (1825–1896), Polish writer, independence activist, and Austrian spy
Zygmunt Kalinowski (born 1949), Polish former football goalkeeper
Zygmunt Kałużyński (1918–2004), Polish film critic, lawyer, and TV personality
Zygmunt Kamiński (1933–2010), Polish Roman Catholic archbishop
Zygmunt Kamiński (1888–1969), Polish painter and professor at the Warsaw University of Technology
Zygmunt Kawecki (born 1942), Polish fencer
Zygmunt Kisielewski (1882–1942), Polish writer
Zygmunt Kiszkurno (1921–2012), Polish sport shooter
Zygmunt Klemensiewicz (1886–1963), Polish physicist and physical chemist
Zygmunt Klukowski (1885–1959), Polish physician, historian, and bibliophile
Zygmunt Konieczny (born 1937), Polish composer of theatre and film music
Zygmunt Konieczny (1927–2003), Polish bobsledder
Zygmunt Krasiński (1812–1859), Polish poet and nobleman
Zygmunt Krauze (born 1938), Polish composer of contemporary classical music, educator, and pianist
Zygmunt Krumholz (1903–1947), Polish footballer
Zygmunt Kubiak (1929–2004), Polish writer, translator, and professor
Zygmunt Kukla (born 1969), Polish conductor, arranger, and composer
Zygmunt Kukla (1948-2016), Polish footballer
Zygmunt Kulawik (1921–1982), Polish footballer
Zygmunt Kurnatowski (1778–1858), Polish count and nobleman
Zygmunt Kęstowicz (1921–2007), Polish actor
Zygmunt Łanowski (1911–1989), Polish translator
Zygmunt Laskowski (1841–1928), Polish physician, surgeon, and anatomist
Zygmunt Latoszewski (1902–1995), Polish conductor, theater director, and music teacher
Zygmunt Łempicki (1886–1943), Polish literature theoretician, Germanist, philosopher, and culture historian
Zygmunt Łoboda (1895–1945), Polish architect
Zygmunt Łoziński (1870–1932), Polish Roman Catholic bishop
Zygmunt Malanowicz (1938–2021), Polish film actor
Zygmunt Marek (1872–1931), Polish socialist politician
Zygmunt Maszczyk (born 1945), Polish retired footballer
 Zigmund Red Mihalik (1916–1996), American basketball player and referee, member of the Basketball Hall of Fame
Zygmunt Miłkowski (1824–1915), Polish romantic writer and politician
Zygmunt Miłoszewski (born 1976), Polish writer and former journalist and editor
Zygmunt Modzelewski (1900–1954), Polish communist politician, professor, economist, and diplomat
Zygmunt Muchniewski (1896–1979), Polish politician, Christian Democratic Party head, and prime minister of the Polish Government in Exile
Zygmunt Mycielski (1907–1987), Polish composer and music critic

N–S
Zygmunt Noskowski (1846–1909), Polish composer, conductor and teacher
Zygmunt Ochmański (1922–2003), Polish footballer
Zygmunt Otto (1896–1961), Polish footballer
Zygmunt Padlewski (1836–1863), Polish insurgent who participated in the January Uprising
Zygmunt Pawlas (1930–2001), Polish fencer
Zygmunt Pawłowicz (1927–2010), Polish Auxiliary bishop of the Roman Catholic Archdiocese of Gdańsk
Žigmund Pálffy (born 1972), retired National Hockey League player from Slovakia
Zygmunt Pieda (born 1933), Polish footballer
Zygmunt A. Piotrowski (1904–1985), Polish born American psychologist
Zygmunt Podhorski (1891–1960), Brigadier General of the Polish Army
Zygmunt Puławski (1901–1931), Polish aircraft designer and pilot
Zygmunt Pytko (1937–1996), Polish international speedway rider
Zygmunt Rozwadowski (1870–1950), Polish painter
Zygmunt Rumel (1915–1943), Polish poet and member of the Polish resistance in World War II
Zygmunt Schmidt (born 1941), Polish footballer
Zygmunt Siedlecki (1907–1977), Polish athlete and Olympic decathlete
Zygmunt Sierakowski (1826–1863), Polish-Lithuanian leader of the January Uprising
Zygmunt Smalcerz (born 1941), Polish weightlifting coach and retired weightlifter, 1972 Olympic flyweight champion
Zygmunt Solorz-Żak (born 1956), Polish businessman and billionaire
Zygmunt Steuermann (1899–1941), Polish footballer
Zygmunt Stojowski (1870–1946), Polish pianist and composer
Zygmunt Świechowski (1920–2015), Polish art historian and architectural conservator
 Zigmunt Ziggy Switkowski (born 1948), Australian businessman and nuclear physicist
Zygmunt Szczotkowski (1877–1943), Polish mining engineer
Zygmunt Szendzielarz (1910–1951), Polish military commander in World War II
Zygmunt Szkopiak (1926–2002), Polish scientist, diplomat, and historian
Zygmunt Szweykowski (1894–1978), historian of Polish literature

T–Z
Zygmunt Turkow (1896–1970), Polish actor, playwright, and director
Zygmunt Vetulani, computer scientist
Zygmunt Vetulani (1894–1942), Polish diplomat and economist
Zygmunt Vogel (1764–1826), Polish illustrator, educator, and classical painter
Zygmunt Waliszewski (1897–1936), Polish painter in the Kapist movement
Zygmunt Weiss (1903–1977), Polish sprinter and sport journalist
Zygmunt Wiehler (1890–1977), Polish popular and film music composer and director
Zygmunt Wielopolski (1833–1902), President of Warsaw
 Zigmunt Zygi Wilf (born 1950), owner of the Minnesota Vikings National Football League team
Zygmunt Aleksander Wnęk (1918–1944), Polish soldier and military officer in World War II
Zygmunt Wojciechowski (1900–1955), Polish historian and nationalist politician
Zygmunt Florenty Wróblewski (1845–1888), Polish physicist and chemist
Zygmunt Wrzodak (born 1959), Polish politician
Zygmunt Zalcwasser (1898–1943), Polish mathematician and Holocaust victim
Zygmunt Zaleski (1882–1967), Polish literature historian, literary critic, poet, publicist, and translator
Zygmunt Załęski (1892–1966), Polish national movement activist, politician and publicist
Zygmunt Zaremba (1895–1967), Polish socialist activist and publicist
Zygmunt Zawirski (1882–1948), Polish philosopher and logician
Zygmunt Zieliński (1858–1925), Polish general
Zygmunt Ziembiński (1920–1996), Polish legal philosopher, logician, and theoretician of law
Zygmunt Zimowski (1949–2016), Polish prelate of the Roman Catholic Church
Zygmunt Zintel (1911–1990), Polish theater, film, and television, actor, and teacher
Zygmunt Żuławski (1880–1949), Polish politician, association activist, and socialist

Surname
 Antoni Zygmund (1900–1992), Polish mathematician
 Paweł Zygmunt (born 1972), Polish retired speed skater
 Ted Zigmunt (born 1951), American politician

See also
 Sigismund
 Zigmunds Skujiņš (born 1926), Latvian writer

Polish masculine given names